2GL may refer to:
 Second-generation programming language, a form of computer language
 2GL (Radio), a radio station in Australia